Arkas Sanat Merkezi (English; Arkas Art Center), an art museum located in the city of İzmir in Turkey. Opened in November 2011, the Arkas Collection created by Lucien Arkas, Chairman of the Arkas Holding, is on display.

History
Located in Kordon and used by the Honorary Consulate of France, the part of the building facing Gulf of İzmir was transferred to Arkas Holding in 2010 for twenty years. The restored building was opened on 19 November 2011 as Arkas Art Center.

Collections and exhibitions

Arkas Art Center exhibits various other works with the Arkas Collection, which was created by Lucien Arkas, the Chairman of Arkas Holding, and contains more than nine hundred works. From September 2019 to January 2020, Pablo Picasso's works will be exhibited at the Arkas Art Center as part of the Picasso-Méditerranée project.

Architectural information
Completed in 1906, the Arkas Art Center is a two-storey building. It has nine exhibition rooms and a workshop.

References

External links

 

2011 establishments in Turkey
Museums established in 2011
Museums in İzmir
Art museums and galleries in Turkey